La Loi du nord ("The Law of the North"; also called La Piste du Nord, "The Northern Trail") is a 1939 French adventure drama film directed by Jacques Feyder who co-wrote screenplay with Alexandre Arnoux and Charles Spaak, based on novel "Telle qu'elle était de son vivant" by Maurice Constantin-Weyer. The films stars Michèle Morgan, Pierre Richard-Willm and Charles Vanel. It tells the story of an escaped prisoner, his woman secretary and two guardsmen in the Far North. It was entered for the Grand Prix du Festival International du Film at the 1939 Cannes Film Festival.

Plot
Robert Shaw manslaughters his wife's lover and runs away with his secretary Jacqueline. Helped by a French trapper who takes them for film-makers, they hide in Northern Canada. But the corporal Dalrymple discovers their identity and hunts them, until Jacqueline dies exhausted by such a hard expedition.

Cast
Michèle Morgan as  Jacqueline
Pierre Richard-Willm as  Robert Shaw
Charles Vanel as Corporal Dalrymple
Max Michel as the Advocate
Youcca Troubetzkov as Ellis
Fabien Loris as Daugh

References

External links

La Loi du nord at DvdToile

1939 films
Films directed by Jacques Feyder
Northern (genre) films
French black-and-white films
French adventure drama films
1930s adventure drama films
1939 drama films
1930s French films